Athlibothrips is a genus of thrips in the family Phlaeothripidae, first described by Hermann Priesner in 1952.

Species
 Athlibothrips caledonensis
 Athlibothrips fuscipes
 Athlibothrips inquilinus
 Athlibothrips yercaudensis

References

Phlaeothripidae
Thrips
Thrips genera
Taxa named by Hermann Priesner